Xi'an–Huyi railway (西户铁路), also known as Xi'an–Yuxia railway (西余铁路) is a railway branch line of the Longhai railway. It runs from Sanmincun railway station in Lianhu District in central Xi'an to Yuxia railway station in Huyi District in southwestern Xi'an.

Commuter rail service
Commuter rail service operated by Xi'an Rail Transit Group started on 1 November 2022.

History 
The Xi'an–Huyi railway was surveyed and designed by the Southwest Railway Design Bureau in 1954 and constructed by the Sixth Railway Engineering Bureau on May 1, 1955. The line officially opened to traffic on February 20, 1956. Due to low passenger volume, the Xi'an–Huyi railway stopped operating passenger services in 2000. Construction of the renovation project started on July 21, 2022.

References 

Railway lines in China
Rail transport in Shaanxi